State Highway 22 ( RJ SH 22) is a State Highway in Rajasthan state of India that connects Mandrayal of Dausa district, Rajasthan, with Pahadi, Rajasthan  of Rajasthan. The total length of RJ SH 10 is 60 km.

References
 State Highway

Dausa district
Alwar district
Bharatpur district
Karauli district
State Highways in Rajasthan